Chowara Chidambaraswamy Temple  is located at Chowwara in Ernakulam district. The presiding deities of north shrine are Shiva in the form of Nataraja, in the sanctum sanctorum facing east. It is believed that this temple is one of the 108 Shiva temples of Kerala and is installed by sage Parasurama dedicated to Shiva. Maha Shivarathri festival of the temple celebrates in the Malayalam month of Kumbha (February - March).

See also
 108 Shiva Temples
 Temples of Kerala

References

108 Shiva Temples
Shiva temples in Kerala
Hindu temples in Ernakulam district